The 2019 World Junior-B Curling Championships were held from January 2 to 10 at the Kisakallio Sports Institute in Lohja, Finland.

Men

Round-robin standings
Final round-robin standings

Qualification game
Wednesday, January 9, 14:00

Playoffs

Quarter-finals
Wednesday, January 9, 20:00

Semi-finals
Thursday, January 10, 09:00

Bronze medal game
Thursday, January 10, 14:00

Gold medal game
Thursday, January 10, 14:00

Women

Round-robin standings
Final round-robin standings

Qualification game
Wednesday, January 9, 08:00

Playoffs

Quarter-finals
Wednesday, January 9, 14:00

Semi-finals
Thursday, January 10, 09:00

Bronze medal game
Thursday, January 10, 14:00

Gold medal game
Thursday, January 10, 14:00

References

External links
Official Website

World Junior-B Curling Championships
Lohja
World Junior-B Curling Championships
World Junior Curling B
World Junior-B Curling Championships
International curling competitions hosted by Finland
World Junior-B Curling